Milo Harbich (13 August 1900 – 13 September 1988) was a Brazilian-born German film editor and director. He was born to Austrian-Brazilian parents who moved to Dresden when he was a small child. He began career as stage actor, but by the early 1930s was increasingly involved with the German film industry. He edited his first film in 1933. During the Nazi era he worked on a mixture of propaganda films and less overtly political entertainment such as To New Shores (1937) and the Marika Rökk vehicle Hello Janine! (1939). He often worked with the  directors Douglas Sirk and Hans Steinhoff.

After having previously made a couple of short films, Harbich directed Commissioner Eyck his first feature film in 1940.

In 1946 he directed Free Land for DEFA in East Germany. The following year he returned to his native Brazil where he continued to work on films intermittently until the early 1960s.

Selected filmography

Editor
 Inge and the Millions (1933)
 What Men Know (1933)
 Today Is the Day (1933)
 Love Must Be Understood (1933)
 Enjoy Yourselves (1934)
 Just Once a Great Lady (1934)
 The Higher Command (1935)
 The Gypsy Baron (1935)
 One Too Many on Board (1935)
 To New Shores (1937)
 Men Without a Fatherland (1937)
 Hello Janine! (1939)

Director
 Commissioner Eyck (1940)
 Free Land (1946)

References

Bibliography
 Feinstein, Joshua. The Triumph of the Ordinary: Depictions of Daily Life in the East German Cinema, 1949-1989. University of North Carolina Press, 2002.

External links

1900 births
1988 deaths
Film people from Dresden
German male stage actors
Brazilian film editors
Brazilian film directors
Brazilian male stage actors
People from Porto Alegre
20th-century German male actors
Brazilian emigrants to Germany